David Anthony Mack (born May 30, 1961) is a former professional runner and Los Angeles Police Department (LAPD) officer involved in the Rampart Division's Community Resources Against Street Hoodlums (CRASH) unit. He was one of the central figures in the LAPD Rampart police corruption scandal. Mack was arrested in December 1997 for robbery of $722,000 from a South Central Los Angeles branch of the Bank of America. He was sentenced to fourteen years and three months in federal prison. Mack has never revealed the whereabouts of the money.

Early life
As an athlete, David Mack ran track for Locke High School and was champion at the CIF California State Meet at 880 yards for two years in a row.

He attended the University of Oregon where he ran track with his high school rival Jeff West. After West transferred to UCLA, Mack considered following suit, but was convinced to stay at UO by coach Bill Dellinger. While in college, Mack dated later world record holder in the 100m & 200m, Flo Jo. In 1980, as a freshman in college, he finished sixth in the Olympic Trials. Mack won three Pac-10 conference titles in the 800 and in his junior year, the NCAA Division I Championship in the 800 meters.

As a professional, Mack ran for Santa Monica Track Club. He qualified for the United States national team, running the 800 metres in the 1983 World Championships in Athletics but failed to advance to the final. He was the rabbit in Sydney Maree's 1500 meter world record and one week later rabbited Steve Ovett to surpass that record. A stress fracture in his shin caused him to fail to make it out of the heats at the 1984 USATF Championships. In 1985 he ran 1:43.35 seconds which at the time was the second fastest time ever by an American and still ranks 9th fastest. He failed to advance from the heats in the 800m at the 1987 World Championships in Athletics. Beset by fatigue from iron deficiency, his last professional race was in 1988.

Police career

Mack joined the Los Angeles Police Department (LAPD) in 1988. He first worked as a patrol officer and then as an undercover narcotics officer. Mack next moved to a late shift in West Los Angeles in 1990, where he began a relationship with Errolyn Romero, a nineteen-year-old ticket taker at the Baldwin Theatre. Mack was awarded the LAPD Medal for Heroism in 1993 for shooting a drug dealer who reportedly threatened his partner, Rafael "Ray" Pérez, although the event described by the two was later discovered to be a lie, and that the officers additionally had planted a gun on the suspect.

Bank robbery
In August 1997, Romero became employed at a Bank of America branch near the University of Southern California campus. On November 6, 1997, Mack entered the bank and claimed he wanted to access his safe deposit box. Romero admitted him to the secure area, where he threw her to the floor and robbed the vault of $722,000.

In her capacity as branch assistant manager, Romero had ordered double the usual amount of cash to be on hand at the bank on the day of the robbery. After one month of investigation, Romero confessed to her role in the crime and implicated Mack as the mastermind. He was arrested in December 1997. His two accomplices were never caught.

Mack was sentenced to fourteen years and three months in prison and has never revealed the whereabouts of the money. He was released on May 14, 2010.

According to the Tupac documentary Assassination: Battle for Compton, citing official legal documents, a reliable jail informant by the name of Ken Boagni, who befriended Rafael Perez in prison, stated Perez claimed the money stolen in the bank robbery was intended to go to Harry Billups, also known as Amir Muhammed, who was friends with Mack, for allegedly carrying out the murder of late rapper Christopher Wallace, also known as Biggie Smalls, because Billups was not paid in full by his contractors, namely Reggie Wright Jr. and David Kenner, because he failed to also murder Sean Combs, the second intended target. Boagni claimed both Perez and Mack were involved in the murder of Wallace, but Billups was the shooter.

Relation to the murder of The Notorious B.I.G.

In April 2007, the estate of Christopher Wallace, a rapper who performed under the name The Notorious B.I.G., filed a wrongful death lawsuit against the City of Los Angeles, which also named Mack, Pérez, and Nino Durden as defendants.

The lawsuit alleged that the officers conspired to murder Wallace, and that Pérez and Mack were present the night of the drive-by shooting which claimed his life on March 9, 1997. In 2010, a federal judge dismissed the lawsuit against the city and the officers.

Depictions in media
In the biography film City of Lies, David Mack is played by Shamier Anderson. The film features the 1997 bank robbery.

References

Further reading

External links

1961 births
African-American police officers
American bank robbers
American male middle-distance runners
American police officers convicted of crimes
Bloods
Living people
Los Angeles Police Department officers
Oregon Ducks men's track and field athletes
Police officers convicted of robbery
Sportspeople from Compton, California
Track and field athletes from California
World Athletics Championships athletes for the United States
21st-century African-American people
20th-century African-American people